Anjireh (also Romanized as Anjīreh) is a village in Derak Rural District, in the Central District of Shiraz County, Fars Province, Iran. At the 2006 census, its population was 823, in 211 families.

References 

Populated places in Shiraz County